Siederia is a genus of small moths. It belongs to the bagworm moth family (Psychidae). Therein, it is placed in subfamily Naryciinae, or, if that is not considered sufficiently distinct, in the Taleporiinae.

Most species were formerly included in the huge "wastebin genus" Solenobia, which is technically a junior synonym of Taleporia.

Species include:
 Siederia alpicolella (Rebel, 1919)
 Siederia cembrella (Linnaeus, 1761)
 Siederia listerella
 Siederia meierella (Sieder, 1956)
 Siederia meieri
 Siederia pineti (Zeller, 1852)
 Siederia rupicolella (Sauter, 1954)
 Siederia saxatilis

Footnotes

References

  (2004): Markku Savela's Lepidoptera and some other life forms – Siederia. Version of 2001-NOV-04. Retrieved 2010-APR-10.

Psychidae
Psychidae genera